Midhat Mursi al-Sayid Umar, also known as Abu Khabab al-Masri (29 April 1953, Egypt – 28 July 2008, Pakistan) was a chemist and alleged top bomb maker for al-Qaeda and part of Osama bin Laden's inner circle. The United States had a $5 million bounty on his head. Although reportedly killed in a U.S. attack in January 2006, he survived and intelligence officials believe he went on to attempt to resurrect al-Qaeda's program to develop or obtain weapons of mass destruction. On 28 July 2008, Mursi was killed in an American drone attack in South Waziristan, Pakistan.

Al-Qaeda activities
Umar is believed by U.S. authorities to have run the infamous Derunta training camp in Afghanistan where he is reported to have used dogs and other animals for his chemical experiments.  He is also alleged to have written an explosives manual, and to have personally trained Richard Reid, the so-called "shoe bomber", as well as Zacarias Moussaoui. The manual is still in use by al-Qaeda operatives today.

Wrong photo
The CIA acknowledged on 26 January 2006 that they had been using a photo of Abu Hamza al-Masri in their wanted photo for Midhat Mursi, who shared the similar alias "Abu Khabab al Masri". Mursi's poster at the Rewards for Justice Program was changed to a different photo.

Misreported death
He was reported to have been killed in the Damadola airstrike in Pakistan on 13 January 2006 along with several other al-Qaeda operatives. The target of the strike was Ayman al-Zawahiri, al-Qaeda's then-number 2 man. Pakistani intelligence originally confirmed Mursi's death in the airstrike along with al-Zawahiri's alleged son-in-law, Abdul Rehman al-Maghribi, but on 8 September 2007, the Washington Post, citing "U.S. and Pakistani officials", said that all the dead in that raid had been locals.

Death
On 28 July 2008, the Pentagon confirmed al-Masri was killed in a missile strike in Pakistan that also killed five other militants including Ibrahim, the son of Ahmad Salama Mabruk.

Family
Mursi's son, Mohammed al-Masri, was born in 1980 in Aqaba, Jordan. He has been associated with the Islamic State of Iraq and the Levant as well as al-Qaeda, though he has expressed dissatisfaction with the conduct of the former.

References

1953 births
2008 deaths
Assassinated al-Qaeda leaders
Egyptian al-Qaeda members
Egyptian chemists
Deaths by United States drone strikes in Pakistan
Egyptian expatriates in Pakistan